Chocolate Puma are a DJ and music production duo from Haarlem, North Holland, consisting of René ter Horst ("DJ Zki") and Gaston Steenkist ("Dobre").  Their stage names include "Zki & Dobre", "The Good Men", and "The Goodmen".

Zki & Dobre have produced dance music under various group names since the early 1990s. Their most notable productions are "Give It Up" (1993) credited to The Good Men, "I Wanna Be U" (2001) credited to Chocolate Puma, and "Who Do You Love Now?" (2001) credited to Riva, and featuring Dannii Minogue. They also founded their own record label, Pssst Music.

Musical career
As the Goodmen, their most notable production was "Give It Up", a 1993 house music track based upon samba styled percussion and the simple, repeating vocal line of the song title. The percussion was inspired by a Sérgio Mendes recording.

The song rose to #1 on the US Billboard Hot Dance Club Play chart in 1993 and made a brief appearance on the US Billboard Hot 100 chart, peaking at #71. When re-released in late 1993, "Give It Up" reached #5 on the UK Singles Chart.

Various monikers
Horst and Steenkist are also known under many aliases including:
The Good Men (alternatively The Goodmen) with a string of hits that started with the hit "Give It Up" in 1993 making it to number 5 on the UK Singles Charts, number 1 on the US Dance charts and number 71 in the US Hot 100. The follow-up "Damn Woman" charted in the Dutch charts in 1994. The Good Men also released the 1994 album Father in the Bathroom.
René Et Gaston (based on their given names René ter Horst and Gaston Steenskist) with the hit "Vallée de larmes" in 1993
Klatsch! (with the hits "Oh Boy" in 1993 and "God Save the Queer" in 1994
F-Action, a musical project in cooperation with Ramon Zenker from Hardfloor, the best known hit being "Let's Get Closer Baby".

They also created JP Records and psst Records and finally Groove Alert founded by Dobre.

In the late 1990s and early 2000s, they appeared in a new set of projects and monikers
Basco, a Big Beat musical project resulting in the album High Involvement
Jark Prongo, with success in the UK in 1999 with "Movin' Thru Your System" accompanied by a similar titled 14-track album released on March 22, 1999 on Pssst Music. The releases stretched from 1999 to 2004. Locally in the Netherlands, Jark Prongo had success with the single "Sweet Little Thing". Most materials of this period including additional EPs Shake It, Rattlesnake and No Api were released on Pssst Music and Hooj Choons. 
Tomba Vira, a project from 2000 to 2002 that started with the EP Down the Park, the hits "Shriek" in 2000, "The Sound of: Oh Yeah" in 2001 followed by "Dynamite" in 2002
Rhythm Killaz, an electronic formation created mainly for the release of the March 2001 hit single/EP "Wack Ass MF"

Their best known monikers besides the early years' The Goodmen were Riva and Chocolate Puma:
Riva, was a name best known for the international hit "Who Do You Love Now?". Originally a Dutch local music hit "Stringer uit", it was adapted into a vocal version for Dannii Minogue at the height of her sister Kylie Minogue who was having a massive hit with "Can't Get You Out of My Head". Riva's "Who Do You Love Now?" went on to reach number 3 in the UK Singles Chart in 2001. An EP Who Do You Love Now? was also released in November 2001 through Alien/United Recordings, exclusively licensed to London Records 90 Ltd. The EP contained 9 various remixes of the song featuring Dannii Minogue. 
Chocolate Puma, thus far the moniker used more consistently by the duo particularly after the hit "I Wanna Be U", yet another big UK hit for them in 2001 that made it to UK Singles Chart' peaking at number 6. 2008 was a very active year with the release of "Always and Forever" that was a hit in the Netherlands, Belgium, France and many European night venues. Also in 2008 came cooperation with the Bingo Players (Maarten Hoogstraten and Paul Bäumer) in two releases being "Disco Electrique" and "Touch Me".

In popular culture
In 1994, Gaston Steenkist (Dobre), one half of the duo Zki & Dobre was instrumental in discovering Filipino-Dutch DJ Laidback Luke after the latter forwarded a demo tape to him. Laidback Luke was signed to a recording contract by the management of Dobre. At the end of the year he has already released two albums on the label Groove Alert newly established by Dobre. Laidback Luke went on to have a prosperous DJ and producing career.

In 1995, Simply Red sampled The Good Men's hit "Give It Up" for their UK #1 hit "Fairground". The Good Men were credited for the sample, and Mendes was also given credit as the performer of "Fanfarra", the original source of the Goodmen's track.

The duo's work has been featured on many DJ mixes from Hooj Choons, Global Underground, and Ministry of Sound.

Discography

As The Good Men

Studio albums

Singles

As Chocolate Puma

Extended plays

Singles

Remixes and edits

Under other aliases

Singles

References

Dutch house music groups
Dutch techno music groups
Dutch musical duos
DJ duos
DJs from Haarlem
Electronic dance music duos
Spinnin' Records artists
Incentive Records artists